Ronald Victor Bell (Chelsea 7 January 1931  –  Farnham ) was an English first-class cricketer.

Ronnie Bell represented Middlesex and Sussex as a left-handed batsman and a slow left-arm orthodox bowler in 189 first-class matches between 1952 and 1964. He took 392 wickets at an average of 28.34, with a personal best of 8/54. He took five wickets in an innings on nineteen occasions and ten wickets in a match once. He died from cancer aged 58.

External links
 Cricinfo
 Cricket Archive

1931 births
1989 deaths
Cricketers from Chelsea, London
Deaths from cancer in England
English cricketers
Marylebone Cricket Club cricketers
Middlesex cricketers
Norfolk cricketers
Sussex cricketers